Charles J. Hubbard Jr. was an American football player. After attending Milton Academy, he played college football at the guard position for the Harvard Crimson football team from 1921 to 1923. He was a consensus All-American in 1922 and 1923. He was elected team captain for the latter year.

Hubbard was also a member of Harvard's crew team. His father, Charles J. Hubbard, and brother, Wynant Hubbard, both attended Harvard.

References

All-American college football players
American football guards
Harvard Crimson football players
Players of American football from Massachusetts
Place of birth missing
Year of birth missing
Year of death missing